Alinda was an inland city and bishopric in ancient Caria, in Asia Minor (Anatolia). Modern scholars identify Alinda with the Hellenistic foundation of Alexandria ad Latmum (Ἀλεξάνδρεια πρὸς τῷ Λάτμῳ) noted by Stephanus of Byzantium.

Location and remains 
It is situated near Demircideresi, on a hilltop which commands the modern-day town of Karpuzlu, Aydın Province, in western Turkey, and overlooks a fertile plain.

The non-restored but very well preserved ruins are much visited, especially within the circuit of organized tours (locally called "safaris") with departure from either the international tourism center of Bodrum or from Milas and reaching Karpuzlu through a mountain road from the south.

In 2018, four kilometers of the ancient stone road, which connects the ancient cities of Alinda and Latmus, were destroyed by villagers to make way for their olive groves.

History 
Alinda has perhaps been an important city since the second millennium BC and has been associated with Ialanti that appear in Hittite sources (J. Garstang, p. 179). It was a member of the Delian League.

It was this fortress which was held by the exiled Carian Queen Ada. She greeted Alexander the Great here in 334 BC. When Alexander captured Caria, he granted Ada to be the ruler of the whole region. 

The city was apparently renamed "Alexandria by the Latmos" shortly afterwards, and was recorded as thus by Stephanus of Byzantium, although sources disagree as to the exact location of the settlement of that name. The prior name of Alinda was restored by 81 BC at the latest. It appears as "Alinda" in Ptolemy's Geographia (Book V, ch. 2) of the 2nd century AD.

Alinda remained an important commercial city, minting its own coins from the third century BC to the 3rd century AD. Stephanus records that the city had a temple of Apollo containing a statue of Aphrodite by Praxiteles.

Alinda has a necropolis of Carian tombs and has been partially excavated. Alinda also had a major water system including a Roman aqueduct, a nearly-intact market place, a 5,000-seat Roman amphitheater in relatively good condition, and remains of numerous temples and sarcophagi.

Ecclesiastical history 
Alinda appears on Byzantine lists of bishoprics. It was a suffragan of the Metropolitan of Stauropolis, the capital of the Roman province of Caria, but was to fade.

Residential Bishops
(incomplete)
Promachios fl.451
John fl.451
Theodoretus fl.536

Titular Bishopric 
It was nominally restored as a Latin titular see of the Roman Catholic Church but has been vacant since the death of the last bishop in 1976, having had the following incumbents, all of the lowest (episcopal) rank : 
 Alexandre-Louis-Victor-Aimé Le Roy, Holy Ghost Fathers (C.S.Sp.) (1892.07.03 – 1921.05.13), as Apostolic Vicar of Gabon (Gabon) (1892.07.03 – 1896.05.24), later Superior General of the Congregation of the Holy Spirit (Spiritans, Holy Ghost Fathers) (1896.07 – 1926), Titular Archbishop of Caria (see) (1921.05.13 – 1938.04.21)
 Edward Komar (1921.06.16 – 1943.09.29)
 Juan Hervás y Benet (1944.01.13 – 1947.12.22)
 Eris Norman Michael O’Brien (1948.02.05 – 1951.01.11) as Auxiliary Bishop of Sydney (Australia) (1948.02.05 – 1951.01.11); later Titular Archbishop of Cyrrhus (1951.01.11 – 1953.11.16), Coadjutor Archbishop of Canberra and Goulburn (Australia) (1951.01.11 – 1953.11.16), succeeding as Archbishop of Canberra and Goulburn (1953.11.16 – 1966.11.20), emeritate as Titular Archbishop of Apamea in Syria (1966.11.20 – 1974.02.28)* Gabriel Manek, Divine Word Missionaries (S.V.D.) (1951.03.08 – 1961.01.03) as Apostolic Vicar of Larantuka (Indonesia) (1951.03.08 – 1961.01.03), later Metropolitan Archbishop of Endeh (Indonesia) (1961.01.03 – 1968.12.19), emeritate as Titular Archbishop of Bavagaliana (1968.12.19 – 1976.05.15)
 Charles Alexander Grant (1961.02.06 – 1967.03.14)
 Robert Lebel (1974.03.11 – 1976.03.26)
 Juan Hervás y Benet (1976.09.30 – 1982.06.06)

References

See also
List of cities founded by Alexander the Great

Sources and external links

 

 
 J. Garstang, The Hittite Empire (University Press, Edinburgh, 1930), p. 179.

 GigaCatholic with titular incumbent biography links
 Tens of pictures but without the agora or theatre

Buildings and structures in Aydın Province
Populated places in ancient Caria
Ancient Greek archaeological sites in Turkey
Roman sites in Turkey
Ruins in Turkey
Former populated places in Turkey
History of Aydın Province
Tourist attractions in Aydın Province
Cities founded by Alexander the Great
Karpuzlu District
Catholic titular sees in Asia
Members of the Delian League